The following is a list of notable alumni of the Ohio State University Moritz College of Law in Columbus, Ohio:

Academia
Linda L. Ammons (1987), Dean of Widener University School of Law
David N. Diner (1983), Dean of Judge Advocate General's Legal Center and School
John W. Garland (1974), President of Central State University
RonNell Andersen Jones (2000), Professor of Law at the University of Utah S.J. Quinney College of Law
Joan Krauskopf (1957), Professor Emeritus of Law at the Moritz College of Law
Arthur T. Martin (1929), Dean of the Ohio State University Moritz College of Law
LeRoy Pernell (1974), Dean of Florida A&M University College of Law and Northern Illinois University College of Law
L. Orin Slagle (1957), Dean of the Florida State University College of Law and Moritz College of Law
Don W. Sears (1948), Dean and Professor Emeritus of Law at the University of Colorado Law School; Purple Heart and Bronze Star recipient
Paul L. Selby (1947), Dean and Professor Emeritus of Law at the West Virginia University College of Law; member of 1942 National Championship Ohio State Buckeyes football team
Gregory J. Vincent (1987), President of Hobart and William Smith Colleges

Business

John W. Creighton Jr. (1957), president and CEO of Weyerhaeuser Company
Bruce Downey (1973), chairman and CEO of Barr Pharmaceuticals (now Teva Pharmaceuticals)
Nicholas R. Emrick (1982), chief operating officer of LexisNexis
John Lowe (1998), CEO of Jeni's Splendid Ice Creams
Nick Mileti (1956), founder and owner of the Cleveland Cavaliers and owner of the Cleveland Indians
Thomas F. Patton (1926), president, chairman and CEO of Republic Steel (now Mittal Steel Company)
Donald Clinton Power (1926), chairman and CEO of GTE Corporation (now Verizon Communications)
Henry Schuck (2009), founder and CEO of ZoomInfo

Government

Federal
Thomas J. Fiscus (1975), United States Air Force Judge Advocate General
Linda Fisher (1982), Deputy Administrator of the United States Environmental Protection Agency
William Isaac (1969), Chairman of the Federal Deposit Insurance Corporation
William Saxbe (1948), 70th United States Attorney General and United States Senator from Ohio
Carmi Thompson (1895), 23rd Treasurer of the United States

State and local
John W. Bricker (1920), 54th Governor of Ohio and United States Senator from Ohio
Aaron D. Ford (2001), 34th Attorney General of Nevada
Paul M. Herbert (1917), 47th, 49th and 52nd Lieutenant Governor of Ohio and Associate Justice of the Ohio Supreme Court
George Sidney Marshall, 38th Mayor of Columbus, Ohio
James H. McGee (1948), first African-American Mayor of Dayton, Ohio
C. William O'Neill (1942), 59th Governor of Ohio and former Chief Justice of the Ohio Supreme Court
Buck Rinehart (1973), 50th Mayor of Columbus, Ohio
Mike Sanders (1994), Jackson County, Missouri executive
Brian Sandoval (1989), 29th Governor of Nevada and former United States District Judge for the District of Nevada 
Russell Suzuki, 15th Attorney General of Hawaii
Edward C. Turner (1901), 26th and 30th Ohio Attorney General and Justice of the Ohio Supreme Court
George Voinovich (1961), 65th Governor of Ohio and United States Senator from Ohio

Journalists
Bob Fitrakis (1982), editor-in-chief of the Columbus Free Press
Chris Geidner (2005), award-winning journalist and legal editor for BuzzFeed
Madison Gesiotto (2017), columnist for the Washington Times and Miss Ohio USA 2014
Erin Moriarty (1977), Emmy Award-winning journalist for CBS News and 48 Hours

Judges

Federal

Jessica G. L. Clarke (2008), United States District Judge for the Southern District of New York
William Miller Drennen (1938), Chief Judge of the United States Tax Court
Ann Donnelly (1984), United States District Judge for the Eastern District of New York
Robert Duncan (1952), first African-American United States District Judge for Ohio and Ohio Supreme Court Justice 
Wallace Samuel Gourley (1929), United States District Judge for the Western District of Pennsylvania
Donald L. Graham (1974), United States District Judge for the Southern District of Florida
James L. Graham (1962), United States District Judge for the Southern District of Ohio
George Philip Hahn (1905), United States District Judge for the Northern District of Ohio
Kenneth Harkins (1943), United States Court of Federal Claims Judge
Charles Sherrod Hatfield (1907), United States Court of Customs and Patent Appeals Judge
Jeffrey J. Helmick (1988), United States District Judge for the Northern District of Ohio
Benson W. Hough (1899), United States District Judge for the Southern District of Ohio
David A. Katz (1957), United States District Judge for the Northern District of Ohio
Sara Elizabeth Lioi (1987), United States District Judge for the Northern District of Ohio 
Rupa Ranga Puttagunta (2007) Associate Judge of the Superior Court of the District of Columbia
David A. Ruiz (2000) United States District Judge for the Northern District of Ohio
George Curtis Smith (1959), United States District Judge for the Northern District of Ohio 
Jeffrey Sutton (1990), United States Court of Appeals Judge for the Sixth Circuit 
William Kernahan Thomas (1935), United States District Judge for the Northern District of Ohio
Herman Jacob Weber (1952), United States District Judge for the Southern District of Ohio

State and local

James F. Bell (1939), Associate Justice of the Ohio Supreme Court
Brent D. Benjamin (1984), Justice of the Supreme Court of Appeals of West Virginia
Lloyd O. Brown (1955), Associate Justice of the Ohio Supreme Court
Paul W. Brown (1939), Associate Justice of the Ohio Supreme Court
Howard E. Faught (1935), Associate Justice of the Ohio Supreme Court
Judith L. French (1988), Associate Justice of the Ohio Supreme Court
W. F. Garver (1893), Associate Justice of the Ohio Supreme Court
Thomas M. Herbert (1955), Associate Justice of the Ohio Supreme Court
Wade L. Hopping (1955), Florida Supreme Court Justice
Robert E. Leach (1935), Chief Justice of the Ohio Supreme Court
Yvette McGee Brown (1985), first African-American female Justice of the Ohio Supreme Court
John M. Matthias (1928), Associate Justice of the Ohio Supreme Court 
Henry A. Middleton (1911), Associate Justice of the Ohio Supreme Court 
Thomas J. Moyer (1964), Chief Justice of the Ohio Supreme Court
Paul Pfeifer (1966), Associate Justice of the Ohio Supreme Court 
James E. Robinson (1893), Associate Justice of the Ohio Supreme Court 
Evelyn Lundberg Stratton (1979), Justice of the Ohio Supreme Court
Beth Walker (1990), Justice of the West Virginia Supreme Court of Appeals

Legislators

Federal
Pete Abele (1953), United States Congressman from Ohio
Walter H. Albaugh (1914), United States Congressman from Ohio
John M. Ashbrook (1955), United States Congressman from Ohio
Thomas W. L. Ashley (1951), United States Congressman from Ohio
Charles G. Bond (1899), United States Congressman from New York
Daniel S. Earhart (1928), United States Congressman from Ohio
Israel Moore Foster (1898), United States Congressman from Ohio; proposed Child Labor Amendment to U.S. Constitution
David L. Hobson (1963), United States Congressman from Ohio
Robert E. Holmes (1949), United States Congressman from Ohio
Lawrence E. Imhoff (1930), United States Congressman from Ohio
Harry P. Jeffrey (1926), United States Congressman from Ohio; author of G.I. Bill
Thomas A. Jenkins (1907), United States Congressman from Ohio
Mary Jo Kilroy (1980), United States Congresswoman from Ohio
Frank Le Blond Kloeb (1907), United States Congressman from Ohio
William Moore McCulloch (1925), United States Congressman from Ohio; key backer of Civil Rights Act of 1964
Howard Metzenbaum (1941), United States Senator from Ohio; introduced WARN Act 
C. Ellis Moore (1910), United States Congressman from Ohio
Grant E. Mouser Jr. (1917), United States Congressman from Ohio
William Huston Natcher (1933), longest-serving United States Congressman from Kentucky; Presidential Citizens Medal recipient
Michael G. Oxley (1969), United States Congressman from Ohio; introduced Sarbanes–Oxley Act 
Zack Space (1986), United States Congressman from Ohio 
Robert M. Switzer (1892), United States Congressman from Ohio 
Mell G. Underwood (1915), United States Congressman from Ohio and United States District Judge for the Southern District of Ohio 
John Martin Vorys (1923), United States Congressman from Ohio

State and local
William G. Batchelder (1967), 101st Speaker of the Ohio House of Representatives
Rupert R. Beetham, Speaker of the Ohio House of Representatives
John W. Bowen (1953), Ohio State Senator
Harold Brazil, Council Member of the District of Columbia
John Patrick Carney (2001), Ohio State Representative
Kathleen Clyde (2008), Ohio State Representative
Keith Faber (1991), 98th President of the Ohio Senate
Patrick O. Jefferson, Louisiana State Representative
Charles Kurfess (1957), 94th Speaker of the Ohio House of Representatives
James A. Lantz (1947), Ohio State Representative
Amy Salerno (1982), Ohio State Representative 
Charles R. Saxbe (1975), Ohio State Representative 
Robert Shaw (1929), Ohio State Senator
Michael Stinziano (2007), Ohio State Representative
Peter Stautberg, Ohio State Representative and Judge of the Ohio First District Court of Appeals 
Mark Wagoner (1997), Ohio State Senator

Other
Brendan Healy (2009), three time All-American and professional lacrosse player
Brandon Mitchell (2013), former National Football League player
Rich Nathan (1980), pastor and author
James Robenalt (1981), lawyer and noted political non-fiction author
Bobby Samini (1995), nationally renowned celebrity attorney 
Michael Shane (1953), lawyer and actor
Stuart A. Summit (1959), Executive Secretary of the New York City Mayor's Committee on the Judiciary

References

List
Ohio State University Law School